Olivewood, olive wood, or olive-wood is the wood of the olive tree.

Olivewood may also refer to;

Places
 Olivewood, the historic home and museum of William Chaffey in Renmark, South Australia
 Olivewood Cemetery (disambiguation)
 Olivewood Elementary School (disambiguation)
 Olivewood Gardens, a community garden and learning center in National City, California
 Olivewood Mini Park in Porterville, California

Other uses
 Olivewood, the film-making industry in Cyprus
 Olive Wood, a character in the 1922 silent film The Bootleggers
 Olive Wood (race horse), the 1917 winner of the Spinaway Stakes
 Cassine laneana, or Bermuda Olivewood, a species of large tree

See also
 Olive wood carving in Palestine
 Olive Woodhouse
 Olive Woodpecker
 Oliver Wood (disambiguation)